Stanišić may refer to:

 Stanišić, Serbia, a village near Sombor
 Stanišić (surname), a Serbo-Croatian surname

See also